This is the discography for American jazz guitarist Tiny Grimes.

As leader 

Blues Groove (Prestige #7138, 1958; Swingville #2035; Prestige #7753, 1970; OJC #817, 1994) - with Coleman Hawkins
Callin' the Blues (Prestige #7144, 1958; Swingville #2004; OJC #191, 1985) - with J. C. Higginbotham and Eddie "Lockjaw" Davis
Tiny in Swingville (Swingville #2002, 1959; OJC #1796, 1992) - with Jerome Richardson
Big Time Guitar With Organ And Rhythm (United Artists #UAL-3232/UAS-6232, 1962)
Chasin With Milt (Disques Black And Blue #33.017, 1968) - with Milt Buckner
Tiny Grimes [AKA Food For Thought] (Disques Black And Blue #33.030, 1970)
Food For Thought (The Definitive Black & Blue Sessions) (Black & Blue #BB-981, 2004) CD
The Guitar Album (Columbia #KG-31045, 1972) 2-LP set - note: live recording from a 1971 concert at Town Hall, NYC featuring seven legendary guitarists; Tiny's trio performs 5 songs (all of Side 3): Frantic, Watermelon Man, Blues For Connie, Food For Thought, Threequarter Moon.
Profoundly Blue (Muse #MR-5012, 1973) - with Houston Person and Harold Mabern
Some Groovy Fours (Disques Black And Blue #33.067, 1974; Classic Jazz CJ-114, 1978)
Some Groovy Fours (The Definitive Black & Blue Sessions) (Black & Blue #BB-874, 2002) CD
One Is Never Too Old To Swing (Sonet #SNTF-736, 1977) - with Roy Eldridge and Frank Wess
Live In Paris, 1974 (France's Concert Records-Esoldun #FC-133, 1989) - with Arnett Cobb and Lloyd Glenn

As sideman 

With Art Tatum
Art Tatum Trio: Piano Solos With Rhythm Accompaniment (Brunswick #BL-58013, 1950) - note: recordings made for the Brunswick label in 1944.
Art Tatum Trio (Dial #DLP-206, 1950) - note: recordings made for the Comet label in 1944.
The Complete Trio Sessions With Tiny Grimes & Slam Stewart, Vol. 1 (Official #3001, 1988)
The Complete Trio Sessions With Tiny Grimes & Slam Stewart, Vol. 2 (Official #3002, 1988)
Trio Days (Charly-LeJazz #CD43, 1999) CD - note: recordings made for the Brunswick, Comet, and Asch labels in 1944.
With Charlie Parker
The Complete Savoy Studio Sessions (Savoy #SJL-5500, 1978) 5-LP set - note: includes the 4 tracks that Tiny's quartet recorded with Bird for Savoy in 1944: Tiny's Tempo, I'll Always Love You Just The Same, Romance Without Finance (Is A Nuisance), Red Cross.
The Complete Savoy & Dial Master Takes (Savoy Jazz #17149, 2002) 3-CD set - note: a new "remastered" release that also includes the 4 tracks with Tiny's quartet from 1944.
With Coleman Hawkins
The Chronological Coleman Hawkins 1944-1945 (Classics #863, 1996) CD - note: includes the 4 tracks that Tiny recorded with Hawkins & His All Stars for Regis/Manor in 1944: All The Things You Are, Step On It, Riding On 52nd Street, Memories Of You.
Hawk Eyes (Prestige, 1959)
Things Ain't What They Used to Be (Swingville, 1961) as part of the Prestige Swing Festival
With Hot Lips Page
The Chronological Hot Lips Page 1940-1944 (Classics #809, 1996) CD - note: includes the 4 tracks that Tiny recorded with Page & His Orchestra for Savoy in 1944: I Got What It Takes, Good For Stompin', Lips Blues (Double Trouble Blues), Blooey.
With Cozy Cole
The Chronological Cozy Cole 1944-1945 (Classics #865, 1996) CD - note: includes the 8 tracks that Tiny recorded with Cole's All Stars for Continental in 1944: Willow Weep For Me, Look Here (Cool Jive), I Don't Stand A Ghost Of A Chance (With You), Take It On Back, Memories Of You, Comes The Don (Harlem Nocturne), When Day Is Done, The Beat (The Drag); also includes the 8 tracks that Tiny recorded with Cole's Quintet for Guild in 1945: Hallelujah, Stompin' At The Savoy, Dat's Love, Through For The Night, Strictly Drums, Night Wind, Why Regret, Now's The Time.
With Ike Quebec
The Chronological Ike Quebec 1944-1946 (Classics #957, 1997) CD - note: includes the 12 tracks that Tiny recorded with Quebec's quintet/septet for Blue Note in 1944 and 1945: Tiny's Exercise, She's Funny That Way, (Back Home Again In) Indiana, Blue Harlem, Hard Tack, If I Had You, Mad About You, Facin' The Face, I Found A New Baby, I Surrender Dear, Topsy, Cup-Mute Clayton.
With John Hardee
The Chronological John Hardee 1946-1948 (Classics #1136, 2001) CD - note: includes the 4 tracks that Tiny recorded with Hardee's quintet for Blue Note in 1946: Tired, Blue Skies, Hardee's Partee, Idaho.
With Earl Bostic
The Chronological Earl Bostic 1945-1948 (Classics 'Blues & Rhythm Series' #5005, 2001) CD - note: includes the 4 tracks that Tiny recorded with Bostic & His Orchestra for Majestic in 1945: The Man I Love, Hurricane Blues, The Major And The Minor, All On.
With Buck Clayton
The Classic Swing Of Buck Clayton (Riverside #12-142, 1960; OJC #1709, 1990) - note: includes the 4 tracks that Tiny recorded with Clayton's Big Four for H.R.S. (Hot Record Society) in 1946: Dawn Dance, Well-A-Poppin', It's Dizzy, Basie's Morning Bluesicale.
With Dud Bascomb and Paul Bascomb
The Chronological Dud And Paul Bascomb 1945-1947 (Classics 'Blues & Rhythm Series' #5061, 2003) CD - note: includes the 4 tracks that Tiny recorded with the Bascomb brothers and their orchestra (sextet) for Alert in 1946: (Back Home Again In) Indiana, Sweet Georgia Brown, After Hours [with the great Avery Parrish on piano], Walkin' Blues.
With Gatemouth Moore
Cryin' And Singin' The Blues: The Complete National Recordings 1945-1946 (Savoy Jazz #17327, 2004) CD - note: includes the 4 tracks that Tiny's septet recorded with Gatemouth for National in 1946: Christmas Blues, Let's Go Back And Try One More Time, Love Doctor Blues, Nobody Knows The Way I Feel (This Morning).
With Walter Brown
The Chronological Walter Brown 1945-1947 (Classics 'Blues & Rhythm Series' #5010, 2001) CD - note: includes the 4 tracks that Tiny's sextet recorded with Walter for Signature in 1947: Open The Door Richard, My Second Best Woman, Let's Get Some Understandin', I'm Living For You.
With Felix Gross
The Complete Recordings 1947-1955 (Blue Moon #6040, 2004) CD - note: includes the 4 tracks that Tiny recorded with Gross & His Orchestra for Savoy in 1949: Love For Christmas, Who Can You Be, You Don't Love Me, You're Great To Me.
With Billie Holiday
The Complete Decca Recordings (GRP #GRD-2-601, 1991) CD - note: includes the 4 tracks that Tiny recorded with Bob Haggart & His Orchestra backing Lady Day in August 1945: Don't Explain, Big Stuff, You Better Go Now, What Is This Thing Called Love; also includes the 2 tracks that Tiny recorded with Bill Stegmeyer's orchestra backing Lady Day in January 1946: Good Morning Heartache, No Good Man. [all 6 tracks are located on Disc 1 of this 2-CD set]
Billie's Blues (Blue Note #48786, 1988) CD - note: includes the 4 tracks that Tiny's sextet recorded with Lady Day for Aladdin in 1951: Detour Ahead, Be Fair To Me, Rocky Mountain Blues, Blue Turning Grey Over You. 
With The Prestige Blues Swingers
Outskirts Of Town [with Art Farmer, Idrees Sulieman, George "Buster" Cooper, Jerome Richardson, Jimmy Forrest, Pepper Adams, Ray Bryant] (Prestige #7145, 1958; Prestige #7787, 1970; OJC #1717, 1992)
With Johnny Hodges
Triple Play (RCA Victor, 1967)
With Johnny Letman
A Funky Day In Paris (Disques Black And Blue #33.015, 1968)
With Hal Singer
Milt And Hal (Disques Black And Blue #33.016, 1968) - with Milt Buckner too!
With Illinois Jacquet
The Blues; That's Me! (Prestige #7731, 1969; OJC #614, 1991)
With Ray Nance
Body And Soul (Solid State #18062, 1970)
With Jay McShann
Jumpin' Blues (Disques Black And Blue #33.039, 1970)
Jumpin' The Blues (The Definitive Black & Blue Sessions) (Black & Blue #BB-979, 2004) CD
With Lloyd Glenn
Old Time Shuffle (Disques Black And Blue #33.077, 1974)
Old Time Shuffle (The Definitive Black & Blue Sessions) (Black & Blue #BB-923, 2002) CD
With Arnett Cobb
Jumpin' At The Woodside (Disques Black And Blue #33.175, 1974)
Live In Paris, 1974 (France's Concert Records-Esoldun #FC-133, 1989)
Jumpin' At The Woodside (The Definitive Black & Blue Sessions) (Black & Blue #BB-940, 2002) CD
With Earl "Fatha" Hines
An Evening With Earl Hines: Live At Dinklers Motor Inn (Chiaroscuro #CR-116, 1973; Vogue #VDJ-534, 1977) 2-LP set
Earl Hines Quartet (Chiaroscuro #CR-169, 1977)
With Rahsaan Roland Kirk 
Boogie Woogie String Along For Real (Warner Bros. #BSK-3085, 1977)

Compilations 

The Cats & The Fiddle: I Miss You So (Bluebird #AXM2-5531, 1976) 2-LP set - note: Tiny recorded 16 songs with 'The Cats' in 1941; 11 of the 16 are included here.
The Cats And The Fiddle: We Cats Will Swing For You (ASV Living Era #AJA-5475, 2003) CD
The Complete Blue Note Forties Recordings Of Ike Quebec And John Hardee (Mosaic #MR4-107, 1984) 4-LP set
Tiny Grimes: Rockin' And Sockin''' (Oldie Blues #OL-8009, 1985)Tiny Grimes And His Rocking Highlanders: Loch Lomond (Whiskey, Women, And... #KM-706, 1986)Tiny Grimes And His Rocking Highlanders: Rock The House 1947-1953 (Swingtime #ST-1016, 1987)Tiny Grimes And His Rocking Highlanders (Riverboat #900.261, 198?)Tiny Grimes & His Rockin' Highlanders: 1950 (Caracol #CAR-442, 198?)Tiny Grimes And His Rocking Highlanders, Volume One (Krazy Kat #KK-804, 1986; Collectables #5304, 1990)  	Tiny Grimes And His Rocking Highlanders, Volume Two (Krazy Kat #KK-817, 1986; Collectables #5317, 1990)	Tiny Grimes And Friends [including The Cats And The Fiddle] (Collectables #5321, 1990)  	Tiny Grimes: Electric Guitar Master 1944-1947 (EPM Musique #159372, 1999) CD	The Chronological Tiny Grimes 1944-1949 (Classics 'Blues & Rhythm Series' #5048, 2003) CD - note: recordings made for the Savoy, Blue Note, and Atlantic labels.The Chronological Tiny Grimes 1949-1951 (Classics 'Blues & Rhythm Series' #5106, 2004) CD - note: recordings made for the Gotham label.The Chronological Tiny Grimes 1951-1954 (Classics 'Blues & Rhythm Series' #5146, 2005) CD - note: recordings made for the United, Gotham, Atlantic, Red Robin, and Apollo labels.		 	The Complete Tiny Grimes, Vol. 1: 1944-1946 (Blue Moon #6005, 2004) CD	  	The Complete Tiny Grimes, Vol. 2: 1947-1950 (Blue Moon #6006, 2004) CD	 	The Complete Tiny Grimes, Vol. 3: 1950      (Blue Moon #6007, 2004) CD	 	The Complete Tiny Grimes, Vol. 4: 1950-1953 (Blue Moon #6008, 2004) CD		The Complete Tiny Grimes, Vol. 5: 1953-1954 (Blue Moon #6009, 2004) CDTiny Grimes: Blues Groove 1958-1959 (Fresh Sound #FSRCD-644, 2011) 2-CD setTiny Grimes: Three Classic Albums Plus (Avid Jazz #AMSC-1188, 2016) 2-CD set - note: includes all of the tracks from the albums, Blues Groove, Callin' The Blues, and Big Time Guitar With Organ And Rhythm, plus 5 of the 6 tracks from Tiny In Swingville''.

References

External Links
 

Discographies of American artists
Jazz discographies